Utahraptor (meaning "Utah's predator") is a genus of large dromaeosaurid dinosaur that lived in North America during the Early Cretaceous period. It was a heavy-built, ground-dwelling, bipedal carnivore.

Discovery and naming

The first specimens of Utahraptor were found in 1975 by Jim Jensen in the Dalton Wells Quarry in east-central Utah, near the town of Moab, but did not receive much attention. After a find of a large foot-claw by Carl Limone in October 1991, James Kirkland, Robert Gaston, and Donald Burge uncovered further remains of Utahraptor in 1991 in the Gaston Quarry in Grand County, Utah, within the Yellow Cat and Poison Strip members of the Cedar Mountain Formation. The holotype of Utahraptor, CEUM 184v.86 consists of a second pedal ungual, with potentially assigned elements from other specimens: pedal ungual CEUM 184v.294, tibia CEUM 184v.260 and premaxilla CEUM 184v.400. The holotype is housed in the paleontology collections of the Prehistoric Museum at Utah State University Eastern. Brigham Young University, the depository of Jensen's finds, currently houses the largest collection of Utahraptor fossils. 

The type species, Utahraptor ostrommaysi, was named by Kirkland, Gaston, and Burge in June 1993. The genus name Utahraptor is in reference to the US state of Utah, where the remains were found. The specific name, ostrommaysi, is in honor to John Ostrom for his investigations on Deinonychus and its bird relationships, and Chris Mays, who helped in the research of Utahraptor by founding Dinamation. From his description, Kirkland stated the meaning of genus name to be "Utah's predator," but the Latin word raptor translates to 'robber' or 'plunderer' not 'predator'. Earlier, it had been intended to name the species "U. spielbergi" after film director Steven Spielberg, in exchange for funding paleontological research, but no agreement could be reached on the amount of financial assistance.

In 2000, the specific name was emended by George Olshevsky to the plural genitive ostrommaysorum. However, Thiago Vernaschi V. Costa and Normand David in 2019 criticized the use of the species name U. ostrommaysorum since it has no clear justification or explanation. Although this spelling has been largely used by other authors, the genus Utahraptor was originally coined with the type species U. ostrommaysi and given that the International Code of Zoological Nomenclature offers no provision for forming a genitive form from two persons with different names, Costa and David conclude that the original spelling ostrommaysi has to be regarded as an arbitrary combination of letters and not a correctly formed genitive form. Under this reasoning, ostrommaysorum has no valid use and the original spelling ostrommaysi does not need an emendation. Other alternative and also invalid spellings were used in scientific literature, such as ostromaysi, ostromaysorum, ostromayssorum, ostromayorum and ostrommaysori.

For instance, some elements were wrongly referred to the genus; the lacrimal bone of the specimen CEUM 184v.83 turned out to be a postorbital from the ankylosaur Gastonia. Britt et al. also suggested that the previously identified manual unguals of the specimens M184v.294, BYU 9438 and BYU 13068 are indeed pedal unguals. This suggestion was confirmed by Senter in 2007.

Description

Later, Rubén Molina-Pérez and Asier Larramendi in 2016 claimed that exaggerated estimates are due to multiple specimens of various ages being mixed.

Although feathers have never been found in association with Utahraptor specimens, there is strong phylogenetic evidence suggesting that all dromaeosaurids possessed them. The genus Microraptor is one of the oldest-known dromaeosaurids, and is phylo­genetically more primitive than Utahraptor. Since Microraptor and other dromaeosaurids possessed feathers, it is reasonable to assume that this trait was present in all of Dromaeosauridae. Feathers were very unlikely to have evolved more than once, so assuming that any given dromaeosaurid, such as Utahraptor, lacked feathers would require positive evidence that they did not have them. So far, there is nothing to suggest that feathers were lost in larger, more derived species of dromaeosaurs. The presence of quill knobs in Dakotaraptor evidenced that even larger dromaeosaurids had feathers.

According to Kirkland et al. in 1993, Utahraptor can be recognized by the following autapomorphies: claws on the hand that are more specialized as cutting blades than in other dromaeosaurids; a lacrimal bone with distinctly parallel mesial and outer sides, giving it an elongate subrectangular appearance in top view, and a base of nasal opening on the premaxilla parallel to the premaxillary tooth row. In the revised diagnosis conducted by Turner et al. in 2012, Utahraptor differs from other dromaeosaurids in: an elongate nasal process of the premaxilla; a distal end of metatarsal III that is smooth, not ginglymoid; an L-shaped quadratojugal without a posterior process; the presence of a well-developed notch between the lesser trochanter and greater trochanter; and dorsal vertebrae that lack pleurocoels. Like other dromaeosaurids, Utahraptor had large curved claws on their second toes.

Classification
Utahraptor is a member of the family Dromaeosauridae, a clade of theropod dinosaurs commonly known as "raptors". Utahraptor is the largest genus in the family, and belongs to the same clade of dinosaurs such as Velociraptor, Deinonychus or Dromaeosaurus. It is classified in the subfamily Dromaeosaurinae, which is found in the clade Eudromaeosauria.

In 2015, Utahraptor was found to be closely related to the smaller Dromaeosaurus and the giant Mongolian and North American dromaeosaurid genera Achillobator and Dakotaraptor:

The cladogram below is the result of a cladistic analysis conducted by Cau et al. in 2017.

Paleobiology

Predatory behavior
 
Kirkland et al. noted that given the huge size of Utahraptor, it was not as fast as Deinonychus and Velociraptor, instead, it would have had a similar speed to the contemporary iguanodonts, and being faster than sauropods. Additionally, the thickness of the tibia indicates that the animal had a significant leg force in order to kill prey. It was also suggested that dromaeosaurids such as Velociraptor and Deinonychus, relied on their hand claws to handle prey and retain balance while kicking it, contrary to this, Utahraptor with much greater weight, may have been able to deliver kicks without the risk of losing balance, freeing the hands and using them to dispatch prey.

According to paleontologist Gregory S. Paul, Utahraptor was not particularly fast and would have been an ambush hunter that preyed on large dinosaurs such as the contemporary iguanodonts and therizinosaurs it shared its environment with. Its robust build and large sickle claw indicate it was well suited to hunting such prey. Like other dromaeosaurine dromaeosaurids, it may have also relied heavily on its jaws to dispatch prey—more so than other types of dromaeosaurids, such as velociraptorines.

Social behavior
In 2001, Kirkland et al, pursued a graduate student's discovery of a bone protruding from a 9-ton fossil block of sandstone in eastern Utah. Also fossilized with the predators are the remains of at least one possible iguanodont herbivore. Kirkland speculated that the Utahraptor pack attempted to scavenge carrion or attack helpless prey mired in quicksand, and were themselves mired in the attempt to attack the herbivore. Similar sites such as the Cleveland-Lloyd Quarry and California's La Brea Tar Pits house such predator traps. Examination of the fossils are ongoing after a decade of excavation, but if Kirkland is correct, it may be one of the best-preserved predator traps ever discovered. The fossils may further reveal aspects into the behavior of Utahraptor, such as whether it might have hunted in groups like Deinonychus was believed to have done. Whether all the Utahraptor individuals were mired simultaneously or were drawn in, one-by-one is unclear. Further examination of the block suggests that the number of Utahraptor remains may be double the amount previously assumed.

While dinosaur behavior can only be theorized, it was later discovered in 2020 that Deinonychus may not have had complex social behavior seen in some pack-hunting animals alive in the modern era, based on differing dietary preferences in adults and juveniles indicating they did not live in long-term family groups. It is unknown if this lack of complex, cooperative social behavior also extended to Utahraptor.

Paleoenvironment
Utahraptor lived in the lower part of the Cedar Mountain Formation, a bed known as the Yellow Cat Member. According to the authors of its description, Utahraptor had an important ecological role as a major carnivore of the paleofauna of the present-day Arches region during the Early Cretaceous, and could probably attack prey larger than itself. Additionally, sauropods ranging between  may have been an important part of its diet. The paleontologist Thomas R. Holtz estimated that Utahraptor existed between 130 million and 125 million years ago. In multiple occasions, the Yellow Cat Member has been dated to Barremian-Aptian ages. Sames and Schudack 2010 proposed a reassignment of the estimated age, compromising Berriasian to Valanginian stages, however, this interpretation was not followed by most authors. Using advanced methods of radiometric and palynological dating, Joeckel et al. 2019 concluded that the Yellow Cat Member is indeed older that previous estimations. The deposition occurred between 139 ± 1.3 million to 134.6 ± 1.7 million years ago, or, Berriasian to Late Valanginian stages. Based on the presence of new palynoflora, Middle Berriasian–Early Hauterivian ages were provisionally assigned. However, the Yellow Cat Member is divided into distinct "lower" and "upper" layers, and Utahraptor are only found within the upper Yellow Cat Member.

Utahraptor was unearthed from the Yellow Cat Member, which during the Berriasian to Late Valanginian was a semiarid area with floodplain prairies, riverine forests, and open woodlands predominated by conifers (Pinophyta), ferns (Polypodiopsida), hornworts (Anthocerotophyta) and other vascular plants. During the description of Mierasaurus, it was interpreted that there was also a waterlogged bog-like environment. There is believed to have been a short wet season. This is supported by the presence of charred spores and other carbonized plant debris in the pollen maceral that indicate the occurrence of ancient wildfires ignited during periods of low precipitation.

Paleofauna that were contemporaneous with the dromaeosaurid in the upper Yellow Cat Member included numerous dinosaurs, such as the medium-sized iguanodonts Hippodraco and Cedrorestes, the other theropods Martharaptor and Nedcolbertia, the nodosaurid Gastonia, and the sauropods Cedarosaurus and Moabosaurus. The only known mammal from the Upper Yellow Cat Member is Cifelliodon.

Other non-dinosaur or avian taxa known from the Member include the fish Ceratodus and Semionotus, the turtles Glyptops and Trinitichelys, Aquatilavipes (fossilized bird tracks), the rhynchocephalian Toxolophosaurus, and the indeterminate remains of hybodontid and polyacrodontid sharks.

Additional paleofauna was recovered, most of it being unnamed and/or indeterminate, including an isolated Mesoeucrocodylian skull that measures  in length. A Neochoristodere unearthed from the Upper Yellow Cat Member, represented by a partial left femur, shows that aquatic paleofauna was present and diverse during the Early Cretaceous of the Cedar Mountain Formation. A large sail-backed iguanodont represented by large vertebrae and fragmentary remains, and an indeterminate eudromaeosaur known from a caudal vertebra and fragmented tail (UMNH VP 20209) were also present.

Cultural significance
Raptor Red was published in 1995, and features the fictionalized story of a female Utahraptor. Written by paleontologist Robert T. Bakker, it was positively regarded by mainstream reviewers, though updates to the science have rendered some of the story line facts presented untrue and the paleontology community was critical of fossil record inaccuracies. Bakker's anthropomorphosis of the titular Red was particularly praised.

In 2018, it was proposed that Utahraptor be the Utah state dinosaur, an act that was approved by the Senate. Initially Utahraptor would have replaced another dinosaur, Allosaurus, as the state's official fossil, but it was decided that Utahraptor would be another symbol of the state. In 2021, Steve Eliason successfully created a proposal for Utahraptor State Park where the block was discovered. It was approved by the state House.

See also
 Timeline of dromaeosaurid research

References

External links
 
 
 Utahraptor Project page at Facebook
 Utahraptor skeletal reconstruction by Scott Hartman
 3D Utahraptor skeletal reconstruction at Sketchfab

Early Cretaceous dinosaurs of North America
Eudromaeosaurs
Extinct animals of Utah
Fossil taxa described in 1993
Taxa named by James I. Kirkland
Paleontology in Utah
Valanginian life
Apex predators